The Northern tall grasslands is one of 867 terrestrial ecoregions defined by the World Wide Fund for Nature. This ecoregion largely follows the Red River Valley in the Canadian province of Manitoba and the American states of North Dakota and Minnesota.

Climate
The Northern tall grasslands have a humid continental climate with moderate precipitation, usually between 450-700mm.

Flora
Dominant grasses include big bluestem (Andropogon gerardi), switchgrass (Panicum virgatum) and Indiangrass (Sorghastrum nutans). In wetter areas, trembling aspen (Populus tremuloides) and bur oak (Quercus macrocarpa) can be found.

Fauna
Like other North American prairie ecoregions, the Northern tall grasslands once supported large herds of bison (Bison bison) and elk (Cervus canadensis), which were hunted by the gray wolf (Canis lupus) and coyote (Canis latrans). All of these save for the coyote have been largely eliminated from the region, though the bison and wolf are recovering. Other, more common species in the ecoregion include white-tailed deer (Odocoileus virginianus), rabbit (Sylvilagus spp.), ground squirrel (Spermophilus spp.) and large populations of waterfowl.

Conservation
Some protected areas of this ecoregion include:
Manitoba Tall Grass Prairie Preserve

See also
Tallgrass prairie
List of ecoregions in Canada (WWF)
List of ecoregions in the United States (WWF)

References

External links

 Northern tall